York Buildings Co v MacKenzie (1795) 3 ER 432 is an English trusts law case concerning the duty of a fiduciary to act in the beneficiaries' interests, without entering any conflict of interest.

Facts
The York Buildings Co was insolvent. Its estates (land in Widdrington, a lease of Strontian Mines, and some bonds and annuities) had been sold to pay creditors. Mr MacKenzie had bought some at a public judicial auction in February 1779, and the sale was confirmed by the Court of Session after several months. Mr MacKenzie then spent substantial sums of money improving the buildings. The York Buildings Co then sought a declaration that the sale be set aside, on the ground that Mr MacKenzie had been an agent and solicitor of the court during the previous proceedings.

Counsel for the appellants outlined the conventional position of the function of fiduciary responsibility in his submissions.

Judgment
The House of Lords held that an agent or solicitor of creditors of a bankrupt owed trustee-like fiduciary duties. So a purchase by him of part of a bankrupt's estate was liable to be set aside when the circumstances showed any impropriety or negligent conduct.

See also
Keech v Sandford (1726) Sel. Cas. T. King 61; 25 E.R. 223; 
Whelpdale v Cookson (1747) 1 Ves. Sen. 9; 27 E.R. 856;

Notes

References
R Flannigan, 'The adulteration of fiduciary doctrine in corporate law' (2006) 122 LQR 449

English trusts case law
United Kingdom insolvency case law
House of Lords cases
1795 in case law
1795 in British law